Vareh Zard (also known as Vareh Zard-e Khersdar) is a village in Malavi Rural District, in the Central District of Pol-e Dokhtar County, Lorestan Province, Iran. At the 2006 census, its population was 852, in 197 families.

References 

Towns and villages in Pol-e Dokhtar County